María Inés Ballester Muñoz (born 28 September 1958) is a Spanish journalist and presenter.

Biography
With a licentiate in Journalism from the Autonomous University of Barcelona, Inés Ballester started her career at Cadena SER, and later went on to the daily magazine of Radio Nacional de España. After a few years she made the leap to television, first at the territorial center of Televisión Española (TVE) in Valencia, as head of programs, and then on Nou and Telemadrid. After three years on Telemadrid, she was signed to Antena 3 in 1997. It was canceled in March 2008.

Shortly afterward, Ballester joined another morning show at La 1, in this case on weekends, under the title , which premiered on 24 May 2008. The program was canceled on 2 August, however, after accumulating a ratings share of 11.3%, below the network's average.

From January to December 2010 she co-presented the program  on La 1, together with Carmen Sevilla.

Since 2009 she has contributed to the program  on Onda Cero, together with Julia Otero.

In October 2011 she joined the  network, presenting the daily magazine . A year later she premiered the program  on the same channel. Her contractual relationship with the chain ended in November 2017.

Ballester has written cookbooks entitled Cocina con corazón, Cocina con más Corazón, and Cocina cada día con corazón, all with the publisher Temas de Hoy, which include some of the best recipes from her TV programs.

In March 2017 she publicly announced that she was cancer-free.

Since 2 September 2014, she has presented  on La 1. The 18 February 2015 edition of this program generated controversy by giving publicity to a false photo of the Podemos candidate for the Presidency of the Government of Andalusia together with a nude woman.

In spring 2020, Ballester was admitted to the hospital after falling severely ill during the COVID-19 pandemic.

Television
 Te'n recordes?, on Nou (1992–1993)
 Sucedió en Madrid, on Telemadrid (1994–1997)
 En Antena, on Antena 3 (1997–1998)
 Ver para creer, on Antena 3 (1999), together with 
 Sabor a verano, on Antena 3 (1999)
 , on Antena 3 (2000)
 Ay, mi madre, on La 1 (2001)
 Flashback, on several FORTA channels: Canal Sur, Telemadrid, Televisión Canaria, and Nou (2002)
 , on La 1 (2002–2008)
 , on La 1 (2008)
 , on La 1 (2010), co-presenter
 Sin ir más lejos, on Aragón TV (2009-2011), contributor
 Saca la lengua, on La 2 (2011)
  , on 13TV (2012–2017)
  , on La 1 (2014)
 , on La 1 (2014–2018)
 Amigas y conocidas, Lazos de Sangre, on La 1 (June–September 2018)

Books
Cocina con corazón (2006). Temas de Hoy. .
Cocina con más corazón (2006). Temas de Hoy. .
Cocina cada día con corazón (2007). Temas de Hoy. .
Cocina cada día con corazón (2008). Temas de Hoy. .

Awards
 Antena de Oro (2005), in the Television category, for her work hosting the program Por la mañana

References

External links
 
 

1958 births
21st-century Spanish women writers
Autonomous University of Barcelona alumni
Cookbook writers
Living people
People from Plana Baixa
Spanish television journalists
Spanish television presenters
Spanish women journalists
Women cookbook writers
Spanish women television presenters